St Luke's Anglican School is an independent Anglican co-educational early learning, primary and secondary day school located in Bundaberg, Queensland, Australia.

Established in 1994 and includes an Early Learning Centre (Junior, Kindy, and Pre-Prep), and Primary School, Middle School, and Senior School. The school's motto is Faith, Performance, Honour.

International Students 
St Luke's Anglican School has stated that they Welcome international students from diverse range(s of) cultures   and are registered to accept students who are studying on a 500 Student Visa from Year 1 - 12. St Luke's also offers Support and Accommodation with the Homestay Program. All international students under the age of 18 are required by law to live with their parents/guardians or with a school approved Homestay Provider.

Houses
The college has four houses that compete throughout the year with each other in cultural and sporting competitions. The main events are the yearly: swimming carnival, athletics carnival, cross country carnival and the rock-pop-mime which is hosted by the Year 12 students.

The houses (with house colours) that compete are as follows:
  Hoog House
  Morris House
  Browning House
  Noble House

It is important to note that the House colours are taken from the school's Coat of Arms. The Houses are named after important figures in the Australian Anglican Church.

See also 

 List of schools in Queensland
 List of Anglican schools in Australia
 Schools in Bundaberg

References

External links 

Anglican high schools in Queensland
Anglican primary schools in Queensland
Educational institutions established in 1994
Boarding schools in Queensland
Junior School Heads Association of Australia Member Schools
Schools in Bundaberg
1994 establishments in Australia